The Official History of Australia in the War of 1914–1918 is a 12-volume series covering Australian involvement in the First World War.  The series was edited by C.E.W. Bean, who also wrote six of the volumes and was published between 1920 and 1942.  The first seven volumes deal with the Australian Imperial Force while other volumes deal with the Australian Naval and Military Expeditionary Force at Rabaul, the Royal Australian Navy, the Australian Flying Corps and the home front; the final volume is a photographic record.

Unlike other official histories which have been aimed at military staff, Bean intended the Australian history to be accessible to a non-military audience. The relatively small size of the Australian forces, enabled the history to be presented in great detail, giving accounts of individual actions that would not have been possible when covering a larger force. Fromelles was also the first time that the First Australian Imperial Force (AIF) saw action on the Western Front and was very costly for the Australians, with  killed, wounded or captured.

Volumes 

 Volume I – The Story of Anzac: the first phase, C.E.W Bean, 1921
 Volume II – The Story of Anzac: from 4 May, 1915 to the evacuation, C.E.W Bean, 1924
 Volume III – The Australian Imperial Force in France: 1916, C.E.W Bean, 1929
 Volume IV – The Australian Imperial Force in France: 1917, C.E.W Bean, 1933
 Volume V – The Australian Imperial Force in France: December 1917 – May 1918, C.E.W Bean, 1937
 Volume VI – The Australian Imperial Force in France: May 1918 – the Armistice, C.E.W Bean, 1942
 Volume VII – The Australian Imperial Force in Sinai and Palestine: 1914 – 1918, H.S. Gullett, 1923
 Volume VIII – The Australian Flying Corps: 1914 – 1918, Frederic Morley Cutlack, 1923
 Volume IX – The Royal Australian Navy: 1914 – 1918, Arthur W. Jose, 1928
 Volume X – The Australians at Rabaul, Seaforth Simpson Mackenzie, 1927
 Volume XI – Australia During the War, Ernest Scott, 1936
 Volume XII – Photographic Record of the War

Other volumes 
The three volumes of the Official History of the Australian Army Medical Services, 1914–1918, mostly written by Arthur Butler, are also considered by the Australian War Memorial to be Volumes XIII, XIV & XV of the Official History.
 Volume I – Gallipoli, Palestine and New Guinea (2nd edition, 1938)
 Volume II – The Western Front (1st edition, 1940)
 Volume III – Special Problems and Services (1st edition, 1943)

Following the publication of the final volume, Bean compiled Anzac to Amiens, a condensed history in one volume aimed at the general public, which was published in 1946. This was followed in 1948 by Gallipoli Mission which detailed how he and his team had researched what had happened in Gallipoli.

See also 
 Military Operations – 29-volume British official history of the war on land, edited by Brigadier-General Sir James Edmonds, part of the 109 volumes of the History of the Great War based on Official Documents by Direction of the Committee of Imperial Defence (1922–1949).

References

External links 
 Australian War Memorial: PDF versions of Volumes I to XI

Books about Australian history
Military history of Australia during World War I
Series of history books about World War I
Official military history books
Book series introduced in 1921